Chris Washington (born March 6, 1962) is a former American football linebacker. He played professionally in the National Football League (NFL) for the Tampa Bay Buccaneers, San Francisco 49ers and the Phoenix Cardinals. Washington was a member of the San Francisco 49ers Super Bowl Championship Team in 1989.

Career 
In his seven seasons in NFL, Washington played five years with Tampa Bay Buccaneer, one year with Phoenix Cardinals, and a year with San Francisco 49ers. Chris still holds the leading record in tackles of 457 at Iowa State University and is a member of the Omega Psi Phi fraternity. Washington's career ended as a result of injuries. He was inducted into the Iowa State Cyclones Hall of Fame in 2009.

Personal life 
Washington resides in Gilbert, Arizona.

References

1962 births
Living people
American football linebackers
Iowa State Cyclones football players
Phoenix Cardinals players
Tampa Bay Buccaneers players
Players of American football from Jackson, Mississippi